Andy Lee (born 14 September 1962) is an English footballer who played as a defender in the Football League for Tranmere Rovers and Cambridge United.

References

External links

Post War English & Scottish Football League A - Z Player's Transfer Database profile

1962 births
Stafford Rangers F.C. players
Tranmere Rovers F.C. players
Cambridge United F.C. players
Altrincham F.C. players
Association football defenders
English Football League players
Living people
English footballers
Footballers from Liverpool